Şehzade Ömer Faruk (27 February 1898 – 28 March 1969) was an Ottoman prince, the son of last caliph of Muslim world Abdulmejid II and Şehsuvar Hanım. He was the imperial son-in-law of Sultan Mehmed VI of the Ottoman Empire.

Early life
Şehzade Ömer Faruk was born on 27 February 1898 in Ortaköy Palace. His father was Abdulmejid II, son of Sultan Abdulaziz and Hayranidil Kadın, and his mother was Şehsuvar Hanım. He had a younger half-sister Dürrüşehvar Sultan.

Education
Ömer Faruk attended the Galatasaray High School. His father, Abdulmejid spoke French, and had the connection with the school through a close Tevfik Efendi. Ömer Faruk's application was prepared by Salih Keramet Bey, son Ottoman poet Nigar Hanım, who had given private lessons to the prince.

Ömer Faruk attended the school for a few years, until it was decided that he should have a more serious vocational training, and at the age of eleven he was sent to Europe. He was to have a military education, as was common practice with princes at the time. He attended the school created by the Empress Maria Theresa in Vienna in 1751, known as the Theresian Military Academy. Ömer Faruk spoke English, German and French with a German accent. His German was as adequate as his Turkish.

After a visit to the Chamber of the Blessed Mantle in the Topkapı Palace, where lengthy prayers were said, he made his way to Vienna. Salih Keramet Bey accompanied him, and settled him into the academy. He spent several years there, undergoing military training that also included extracurricular courses in basket-weaving, carpentry, masonry, construction works, metalworking, and other manual skills. But for more rigorous, iron-fisted and disciplined training, Ömer Faruk was transferred from Vienna to Potsdam Military Academy in Prussia. The transfer idea was of Enver Pasha, the most powerful man of Ottoman Empire.

Enver Pasha wanted young princes should receive a military education, and for this purpose he allocated the Palace of Ihlamur as the Princes School. It became compulsory for all princes below the age of fifteen to attend this school. Here besides their military training, they were taught literature, history, religion, mathematics, and geometry. Ömer Faruk and Abdulmejid I's grandson Şehzade Mehmed Şerefeddin, the brother of Enver Pasha's wife, Naciye Sultan, were transferred to Germany for military training. The ministry of war issued a Decree for the education for the two princes.

Military career
Ömer Faruk graduated from the Prussian Military Academy in Potsdam as a professional Prussian officer. His demeanour reflected his strict German education, and until his death he remained a severe soldier but only in appearance, as deep down he was a romantic at heart, and he never gave up his Turkish habits.

During the First World War, Ömer Faruk fought for the Germans. The prince was sent to Galicia, and from there to Verdun, where he was assigned to the battlefield and where the battles with the French were quite bloody. He fought like a professional soldier, and Kaiser Wilhelm II granted him first the Red Eagle medal, then the Iron Cross of the First Degree. The Kaiser sent a golden cigarette case, as well as a signed photograph of himself together with the medal.

When the Germans lost the battle at Verdun, Ömer Faruk returned to Potsdam, where he was appointed to the German emperor's First Foot Guards Regiment. The two requirements for enrolment in this regiment were that one must belong to one of the most aristocratic families in Germany and be taller 
than 1.9 meters. Every Prussian prince was registered as an officer in this regiment from the age of ten, but those short in height would not take part in the parades. The prince was accepted into the regiment despite being only 1.85 meters tall. He was the shortest among his colleagues, yet he took part in all the parades in front of the kaiser.

By 1918, he was serving as honorary aide-de-camp to Sultan Mehmed VI. He was also serving as first lieutenant in the infantry of the Ottoman army.

Personal life
In 1919, a prospective bride was proposed for Faruk. Emine Düriye Hanım was the daughter of Mahmud Muhtar Pasha and his wife, the Egyptian princess Nimetullah, the daughter of Khedive Isma'il Pasha. Mahmud Mukhtar himself proposed the marriage. However, Faruk declined the proposal. Between 1919 and 1924, he served as president of the Fenerbahçe Sports Club.

First marriage

Ömer Faruk and Sabiha Sultan, the daughter of Mehmed VI and Nazikeda Kadın, were in love with each other. When Abdulmejid asked Sabiha's hand in marriage for his son, Mehmed flatly refused as there was no such thing as a marriage between cousins. His mother Şehsuvar, called on Nazikeda, and succeeded in convincing her.

The marriage took place on 5 December 1919, in the pavilion of the sacred relics, Topkapı Palace. The marriage was performed by Şeyhülislam Hayrizade Ibrahim Efendi. Sabiha Sultan's deputy was Başkatip Ali Fuad Bey, and Ömer Faruk's deputy was Ömer Yaver Pasha. The wedding reception took place four months later on 29 April 1920 at the Yıldız Palace.

In May 1920, ten days after their wedding, Faruk and Sabiha moved to the mansion of Rumelihisarı. In October of the same year, Mehmed VI bought two houses for his daughters in Nişantaşı. The mansions were known as the Twin Palaces. He gave one house to Ulviye Sultan, and the other to Sabiha. Faruk and Sabiha decided to live in Nişantaşı during the winter and Rumelihisarı in the summer.

Issue and exile
The couple's eldest daughter, Neslişah Sultan was born on 4 November 1921 in the Nişantaşı Palace. She was followed two years later by Hanzade Sultan, born on 19 September 1923 in the Dolmabahçe Palace.

At the exile of the imperial family in March 1924, Ömer Faruk and his wife and daughters and his parents firstly settled in Switzerland. Later they moved to Nice, where her youngest daughter Necla Sultan was born on 15 May 1926.

In 1940, he attended the wedding of her daughter, Neslişah Sultan and Prince Mohamed Abdel Moneim, son of Egypt's last khedive Abbas Hilmi II. His two other daughters, Hanzade Sultan, and Necla Sultan also married Egyptian princes, Mehmed Ali Ibrahim in 1940, and Amr Ibrahim in 1943 respectively.

Divorce and second marriage
Ömer Faruk developed an increased interest in his cousin Mihrişah Sultan, the daughter of crown prince Şehzade Yusuf Izzeddin. It was also a public knowledge that things weren't going well between Faruk and Sabiha.

In 1944, Mihrişah even sided with Faruk when the council chose Prince Ahmed Nihad as the head of the family. While Sabiha backed the council's decision and approved the choice of the leader. Her daughters also sided with her. Faruk accused Sabiha of turning their daughters against him. But he was already in love with Mihrişah and the issue of the council was just an excuse.

Faruk divorced Sabiha on 5 March 1948, after twenty eight years of marriage, and just four months later married Mihrişah in a religious ceremony on 31 July 1948. In the prenuptial agreement she asked that the right to divorce her husband be included in the contract.

However, their marriage did not last and in 1959 Mihrişah divorced Faruk using her right to divorce her husband. Later Faruk would tell his friends "I divorced the most beautiful woman in the world to marry the ugliest one. Fate!"

Death
Ömer Faruk died on 28 March 1969 in Cairo, Egypt. His body was taken back to Istanbul, and was buried in the mausoleum of Sultan Mahmud II.

Honours

Ottoman honours 
 Order of the House of Osman, Jeweled
 Order of Osmanieh, 1st Class
 Order of the Medjidie, 1st Class
 Imtiyaz War Medal in Silver
 Hicaz Demiryolu Medal in Gold
 Iftikhar Sanayi Medal 
 Gallipoli Star
 Liakat War Medal in Silver

Foreign honours 
: Grand-Cross Order of Leopold, 6 June 1918
: 
Order of the Iron Cross
Order of the Red Eagle, 1st Class

Military appointments

Military ranks and army appointments
1914: Prussian Officer, German Army
 1918: First Lieutenant of Infantry, Ottoman Army

Honorary appointments
 1918: Aide-de-Camp to the Sultan

Issue

Ancestry

References

Sources

1898 births
1969 deaths
19th-century people from the Ottoman Empire
20th-century people from the Ottoman Empire
Ottoman Army officers
Ottoman princes
Royalty from Istanbul
World War I